Benzenesulfonyl chloride is an organosulfur compound with the formula C6H5SO2Cl. It is a colourless viscous oil that dissolves in organic solvents, but reacts with compounds containing reactive N-H and O-H bonds. It is mainly used to prepare sulfonamides and sulfonate esters by reactions with amines and alcohols, respectively.  The closely related compound toluenesulfonyl chloride is often preferred analogue because it is a solid at room temperature and easier to handle.

The compound is prepared by the chlorination of benzenesulfonic acid or its salts with phosphorus oxychloride or, less commonly, by a reaction between benzene and chlorosulfuric acid.

The Hinsberg test for amines involves their reaction with benzenesulfonyl chloride.

References

Reagents for organic chemistry
Sulfonyl halides
Phenyl compounds